James Wellington McLaughlin (August 24, 1840 – August 9, 1903) was an Ontario doctor and political figure. He represented Durham West in the Legislative Assembly of Ontario as a Liberal from 1879 to 1890.

He was born in Cavan Township, Durham County, Upper Canada in 1840, the son of John McLaughlin, who came from Ireland. The family later settled in Darlington Township. McLaughlin studied at the University of Toronto and the University of Edinburgh. He set up practice in Bowmanville. In 1866, he married Ida Ella Gross. McLaughlin was examiner for the University of Toronto and for the Medical Council of Ontario.

His older brother, Robert was a businessman who was involved first in manufacturing carriages and later automobiles.

External links 
The Canadian parliamentary companion, 1889 JA Gemmill

1840 births
1903 deaths
Alumni of the University of Edinburgh
Ontario Liberal Party MPPs
People from Clarington
Physicians from Ontario
University of Toronto alumni